Undurraga is a surname. Notable people with the surname include:

Francisco Undurraga (born 1965), Chilean politician
Cristián Undurraga (born 1954), Chilean architect
Paz Undurraga (1930–2019), Chilean singer